Events in the year 2014 in Guinea-Bissau.

Incumbents
President: Manuel Serifo Nhamadjo
Prime Minister: Rui Duarte de Barros

Events
 13 April - General election
 18 May - Second round of the Presidential election; won by José Mário Vaz.

References

 
Guinea-Bissau
Years of the 21st century in Guinea-Bissau
2010s in Guinea-Bissau
Guinea-Bissau